Hemsleya is a genus of flowering plants belonging to the family Cucurbitaceae.

Its native range is Eastern Himalayas to southern China and Papuasia. It is native to the countries of Assam (in India), Bismarck Archipelago (island group, part of Papua New Guinea), China, East Himalayas, Maluku Islands, New Guinea, Thailand and Vietnam.

The genus name of Hemsleya is in honour of William Hemsley (1843–1924), an English botanist. It was first described and published in J. Linn. Soc., Bot. Vol.23 on page 490 in 1888.

Knowns species
According to Kew:

Hemsleya amabilis 
Hemsleya carnosiflora 
Hemsleya chengyihana 
Hemsleya chinensis 
Hemsleya cirromitrata 
Hemsleya delavayi 
Hemsleya dipteriga 
Hemsleya dolichocarpa 
Hemsleya dulongjiangensis 
Hemsleya ellipsoidea 
Hemsleya emeiensis 
Hemsleya endecaphylla 
Hemsleya gigantha 
Hemsleya graciliflora 
Hemsleya kunmingensis 
Hemsleya lijiangensis 
Hemsleya macrocarpa 
Hemsleya macrosperma 
Hemsleya mitrata 
Hemsleya panacis-scandens 
Hemsleya panlongqi 
Hemsleya peekelii 
Hemsleya pengxianensis 
Hemsleya sphaerocarpa 
Hemsleya turbinata 
Hemsleya zhejiangensis

References

Other sources
 Li, D. Z. 1993. Systematics and evolution of Hemsleya (Cucurbitaceae). Yunnan Science & Technology Press. 1-126. Note: accepts
 Schaefer, H. & S. S. Renner. 2011. Phylogenetic relationships in the order Cucurbitales and a new classification of the gourd family (Cucurbitaceae). Taxon 60:122-138. Note: accepts
 Schaefer, H. et al. 2009. Gourds afloat: a dated phylogeny reveals an Asian origin of the gourd family (Cucurbitaceae) and numerous oversea dispersal events. Proc. Roy. Soc. Biol. Sci. Ser. B 276:847. Note: should be included in Gomphogyne

Cucurbitaceae
Cucurbitaceae genera
Plants described in 1888
Flora of Eastern Asia